Chernovitsa is a rural locality (a village) in Mglinsky District, Bryansk Oblast, Russia. The population was 60 as of 2010. There is 1 street.

Geography 
Chernovitsa is located 13 km north of Mglin (the district's administrative centre) by road. Kiselevka and Chernoruchye are the nearest rural localities.

References 

Rural localities in Mglinsky District